Upper Colo is a locality of Sydney, in the state of New South Wales, Australia. It is located in the City of Hawkesbury west of Colo and south of Colo Heights, on the Colo River, a tributary of the Hawkesbury River. It was previously known as Colo Upper.

References

Suburbs of Sydney
City of Hawkesbury
Hawkesbury River